The Ambulance is a 1990 American comedy thriller film written and directed by Larry Cohen. It stars Eric Roberts, Megan Gallagher, James Earl Jones, Janine Turner, Red Buttons, and Eric Braeden as the Doctor. Kevin Hagen plays a cop.  In his first film role, Stan Lee of Marvel Comics has a small role as himself.

Plot
 
Aspiring comic book artist Josh Baker meets a young woman named Cheryl on the streets of New York City, who proceeds to collapse and is rushed to a hospital by an ambulance.  When Josh arrives at the hospital, he is shocked to find that there is no record of Cheryl ever being admitted and he soon learns another startling discovery, Cheryl's roommate also vanished after being picked up by the same ambulance.

Convinced that there is some sort of conspiracy going on, Josh proceeds to investigate the disappearances, despite the overt disdain and discouragement from Lt. Spencer.

Cast
 Eric Roberts as Josh Baker
 James Earl Jones as Lieutenant Frank Spencer
 Megan Gallagher as Officer Sandra Malloy
 Red Buttons as Elias Zacharai
 Janine Turner as Cheryl Turner
 Eric Braeden as The Doctor
 Richard Bright as Detective Jerry McClosky
 James Dixon as Detective John "Jughead" Ryan
 Jill Gatsby as Jerilyn O'Brien
 Martin Barter as Street Gang Leader
 Laurene Landon as Patty
 Nick Chinlund as Hugo (as Nicholas Chinlund)
 Beatrice Winde as Head Nurse
 Kevin Hagen as Cop At Stables
 Matt Norklun as Ambulance Driver
 Rudy Jones as Ambulance Driver
 Stan Lee as Marvel Comics Editor
 Deborah Hedwall as Nurse Barbera Feinstein
 Susan Blommaert as Hospital Receptionist
 Jordan Derwin as Hospital Official
 Alexandra Jones as The Waitress
 Michael O'Hare as Hal

Production
Cohen later said he was inspired by "the concept of taking something that is thought of as being benign or benevolent... or anything else that has a safe and wholesome image, and turning it into an object of terror." He had done this for It's Alive (babies) and The Stuff (junk food) and wanted to do it with ambulances. "When you hear or see an ambulance on the street, it’s usually considered to be something that is going to rescue you and take care of you, a vehicle of mercy," said Cohen. "In this story, it’s actually a vehicle of murder. The whole idea of an ambulance that suddenly arrives from nowhere, picks people up, and takes them away to some dark place where they are never seen or heard of again was completely original and creepy."

Cohen says at one stage the financiers wanted a "classier" title than The Ambulance so he retitled it In Thin Air. They changed their mind and the film went back to being called The Ambulance. In the May, 1990 edition of his column Stan's Soapbox, Stan Lee mentions playing himself in a scene in "an adventure mystery called Into Thin Air and refers to the name change in a later column.

Cohen wanted to cast John Travolta or Jim Carrey in the lead but his producers refused.

Donald Trump made a small cameo in a deleted scene.

Jamie Lee Curtis was originally considered to play Officer Sandra Malloy

The role of the villain was originally played by Wesley Addy. However Cohen was unhappy with his performance and recast the role with Eric Braeden. Braeden's casting came at the suggestion of Cohen's mother who was a fan of The Young and the Restless.

Home media
The film was released on Blu-ray on March 13, 2018 by Scream Factory.

See also
List of films featuring diabetes

References

External links
 
 
 

1990 films
1990 comedy films
1990 crime thriller films
1990s crime comedy films
1990s comedy thriller films
1990s English-language films
American comedy thriller films
American crime comedy films
American crime thriller films
Films about comics
Films about missing people
Films directed by Larry Cohen
Films scored by Jay Chattaway
Films set in New York City
Films with screenplays by Larry Cohen
Triumph Films films
1990s American films